Butlers Lane railway station serves the northern part of the Four Oaks district of Sutton Coldfield, England.  It is situated on the Cross-City Line.  The station, and all trains calling there are operated by West Midlands Trains.

History
The station was opened as a temporary wooden station in 1957 under British Railways, to coincide with the introduction of new diesel multiple units on the line from Birmingham to Lichfield, it was originally known as Butlers Lane Halt despite being staffed from the beginning. It became one of the stations served by the new Cross-City Line from 1978. The original wooden station was rebuilt as a permanent structure during 1991/92, to coincide with the electrification of the line by British Rail.

Facilities
The station has a staffed ticket office on the southbound platform, open on a part-time basis throughout the week.  A self-service ticket machine is also available for use when the office is closed and for collecting pre-paid tickets.  Waiting shelters are located on both platforms and train running information is given via CIS displays, timetable posters, automated announcements and two customer help points.  No step-free access is possible to either platform, as both entrances from the road above require the use of steps.

Services
The station is served by West Midlands Trains with local Transport for West Midlands branded "Cross-City" services, operated by Class 323 electrical multiple units with an average journey time to Birmingham New Street of around 26 minutes.
On Mondays to Saturdays, two trains per operate southbound; to Bromsgrove via Longbridge. Northbound there are also two trains per hour, to Lichfield Trent Valley. On Sundays, trains run every 30 minutes between Lichfield Trent Valley and Redditch.

References

External links

Rail Around Birmingham and the West Midlands: Butlers Lane station

Sutton Coldfield
Railway stations in Birmingham, West Midlands
DfT Category E stations
Railway stations opened by British Rail
Railway stations in Great Britain opened in 1957
Railway stations in Great Britain closed in 1991
Railway stations in Great Britain opened in 1992
Railway stations served by West Midlands Trains